Karimabigha is a small village in Kasar Block, Sheikhpura District, in Bihar, India.

Demographics
There are a total of 65-70 families in the village, comprising a population of 350-450, of which 52% are males and 48% are females according to the Census of 2011.

All its people are Kurmi.

Government
As per the Constitution of India and Panchyati Raaj Act, Karimabigha village is administrated by Mukhiya (Head of Panchayat) who is elected representative of Panchayat. Karimabigha comes under Sheikhpura legislative constituency of state of Bihar and it also comes under the Sheikhpura LokSabha constituency.

Economy
Agriculture is the main occupation, with the main crops being rice, onions, and wheat. The cultivation and growing of onion also offers substantial income to the residents. Many people also work in government and private sectors.

References

Villages in Sheikhpura district